XHSCBP-FM is a community radio station on 91.9 FM in Ciudad Altamirano, Guerrero. The station is owned by the civil association Altamiradio Comunicaciones, A.C.

History
Altamiradio Comunicaciones filed for a community station on May 13, 2016. The station was awarded on April 11, 2018.

References

Radio stations in Guerrero
Community radio stations in Mexico
Radio stations established in 2018